Volvarina avena, common name the orange-banded marginella, is a species of sea snail, a marine gastropod mollusk in the family Marginellidae, the margin snails.

Forma
 Volvarina avena f. beyerleana (Bernardi, 1953): synonym of Volvarina beyerleana (Bernardi, 1853)
 Volvarina avena f. varia G. B. Sowerby, 1846 accepted as Volvarina avena (Kiener, 1834)

Description
The size of the shell varies between 9 mm and 16 mm.

Distribution
This species occurs in the Caribbean Sea, the Gulf of Mexico and off the Lesser Antilles; in the Atlantic Ocean from North Carolina, USA, to Eastern Brasil.

References

 Rosenberg, G.; Moretzsohn, F.; García, E. F. (2009). Gastropoda (Mollusca) of the Gulf of Mexico, pp. 579–699 in: Felder, D.L. and D.K. Camp (eds.), Gulf of Mexico–Origins, Waters, and Biota. Texas A&M Press, College Station, Texas

External links
 

Marginellidae
Gastropods described in 1834